Eligio Martínez (born 21 July 1955) is a Bolivian footballer. He played in 14 matches for the Bolivia national football team in 1989. He was also part of Bolivia's squad for the 1989 Copa América tournament.

References

External links
 

1955 births
Living people
Bolivian footballers
Bolivia international footballers
Place of birth missing (living people)
Association football defenders
Club Bolívar players
The Strongest players
C.D. Jorge Wilstermann players